Dennis Anthony Gildea (October 9, 1898 – February 22, 1976) was an American football player and coach.

Early life & military service
Gildea was born on October 9, 1898, in the Roxbury neighborhood of Boston, Massachusetts. He attended Boston College High School. He enlisted and served in the United States Army during World War I.

College football
Gildea played Center for the Holy Cross Crusaders from 1920 to 1922. The Crusaders went 17–9 during Gildea's three years on the team. He was elected captain during the 1921 season. “The Iron Major” Frank Cavanaugh rated him as one of the best blockers he ever saw.

Early coaching career
In 1922 and 1923, Gildea served as assistant coach at Fitchburg High School. He then served as head coach at Leominster High School in 1924 and 1925.

NFL
In 1926, played seven games for the Hartford Blues of the National Football League.

Everett High School
From 1926 to 1954, Gildea was head football coach at Everett High School. He compiled an overall record of 163–72–29. His teams were champions in 1927, 1936, and 1945. Gildea was known as an innovator in high school football. His 1940s teams used the T formation and he was one of the first coaches to frequently use substitutions and special assignments for certain players.

In addition to serving as EHS's football coach, Gildea was also an English teacher, baseball and track and field coach, and from 1945 to 1963 served as athletic director.

Personal life and death
In 1926 Gildea married Ethel K. Barry, a schoolteacher from Cambridge, Massachusetts. They had two children, Barry and Dennis, Jr. Barry played football for Everett High and coached football at Holbrook High School, Lynn English High School, and Northeast Metropolitan Regional Vocational High School. Dennis, Jr. worked as a night manager at a Roy Rogers outside of Alexandria, Virginia. He was one of four men killed in a high-profile robbery there on March 6, 1976.

In 1935, Gildea graduated from Boston College Law School.

Gildea died of a stroke on February 22, 1976, in Peabody, Massachusetts.

References

1898 births
1976 deaths
Boston College High School alumni
Boston College Law School alumni
Hartford Blues players
High school football coaches in Massachusetts
Holy Cross Crusaders football players
Massachusetts lawyers
Sportspeople from Boston
Players of American football from Boston
College of the Holy Cross alumni
20th-century American lawyers
United States Army personnel of World War I